Neglected and underutilized crops are domesticated plant species used in previous centuries for food, fibre, fodder, oil or medicinal properties, whose domestic and industrial use have been reduced for various reasons. Other terminologies used to describe these crops include traditional, local, alternative, minor, orphan, abandoned, lost, niche, underused or underdeveloped; and in recent trends, are often referred to as forgotten or smart foods.

Reduction in use is partially due to supply or consumption constraints, poor shelf life, unrecognized nutritional value, poor consumer awareness, and its reputational perception as famine food ("poor people's food"), which in part, is due to the modernization of agricultural practices. Some crops were so severely neglected that genetic erosion of their genepool resulted in them becoming regarded as lost crops.

As the demand for plant and crop attributes changes (reappraisal or discovery of nutritional traits, culinary value, adaptation to climate change, etc.), some previously neglected crops such as oil palm, soybean, and kiwifruit, have overcome such constraints via wider production and use, becoming regarded as globally significant crops.

Although large-scale agricultural production options for neglected crops appear to be increasingly exhausted, many species of these crops have the potential to contribute to food security, nutrition, dietary and culinary diversification, health and income generation, as well as the provision of environmental services.

Cherimoya and Bambara crops produced in Colombia and Mozambique respectively, aid the local population in food security, allowing them physical and economic access to sufficient food for meeting their dietary needs, even during famine.

Overview

While just three crops, namely maize, wheat and rice, account for approximately 50% of the world's consumption of calories and protein,  about 95% of the world's food needs are provided by just 30 species of plants. 

In stark contrast, names of crop species compiled as edible, extend to the region of around 12,650. Among these, are neglected and underutilized plants, that could be, and in many cases have been, used for food and other uses on a larger scale, historically.

Definition
It is difficult to precisely define which attributes make a crop "underutilized", but often they display the following features:
 Linkage with the cultural heritage of their places of origin
 Local and traditional crops whose distribution, biology, cultivation and uses are poorly documented
 Adaptation to specific agroecological niches and marginal land
 Weak or no formal seed supply systems
 Traditional uses in localized areas
 Produced in traditional production systems with little or no external inputs
 Receive little attention from research, extension services, policy and decision makers, and consumers 
 May be highly nutritious and/or have medicinal properties or other multiple uses

Neglected crops are primarily grown by traditional farmers. These species may be widely distributed beyond their centres of origin but tend to occupy special niches in the local production and consumption systems. They are important for the subsistence of local communities, yet remain poorly documented and neglected by the mainstream research and development activities. Many staple crops, especially in the developing world, are poorly studied by researchers. For example, the Green Revolution saw massive changes in agricultural productivity in Asia, but African crops saw little benefit.

Importance
They continue to play an important role in the subsistence and economy of poor people throughout the developing world, particularly in the agrobiodiversity-rich tropics. Despite their potential for dietary diversification and the provision of micronutrients such as vitamins and minerals, they continue to attract little research and development attention.

Alongside their commercial potential, many of the underused crops also provide important environmental services, as they are adapted to marginal soil and climate conditions.

Constraints
The following are frequent constraints:
 limited germplasm available;
 lack of technical information;
 lack of national policy;
 lack of interest by researchers, agriculturists and extension workers;
 lack of producer interest.

Examples

Determination of the underutilized status of a crop varies among researchers. Different criteria and approaches are used to define this particular group of crop. Neglect refers to the attention the crop has received from research and development and can be evaluated by how well national and international policy and legal frameworks and research and development programs support the conservation and sustainable use of the crop. Underutilization is particular to the geography and potential for a crop to contribute to better to diets and production systems. In any cases where exotic species or diversified species are underutilized at certain region, these are not necessarily underutilized in other parts of the world. Below is an example list of neglected and underutilized species that is not exhaustive.

Cereal and pseudocereal crops

Fruits and nuts species

Vegetable and pulse crops

Root and tuber crops

Other crops 

 Ensete ventricosum

Industrial underutilized crops

Oil seeds

International events that fostered underutilized crops

 1987 - Establishment of the International Centre for Underutilized Crops (ICUC)
 1996 - The FAO Global Plan of Action for Plant Genetic Resources for Food and Agriculture emphasized the importance of underutilized crops
 1999 - At an international workshop held in Chennai, India, the Consultative Group of International Agricultural Research (CGIAR) recognized the contribution that neglected and underutilized species make to food security, rural incomes and combating poverty
 2002 - Establishment of the Global Facilitation Unit of Underutilized Species (GFU) of the Global Forum on Agricultural Research (GFAR), and was housed within Bioversity International, Rome, Italy.
 2008 - Establishment of Crops for the Future (CFF) which is a merging of ICUC and GFU, based in Malaysia 
 2011 - Establishment of Crops for the Future Research Centre (CFFRC) in Malaysia 
 2012 - The international Crops for the 21st Century seminar held on 10–13 December 2012 in Córdoba, Spain aimed to discuss major topics related to underlining the role of neglected and underutilised species to address food and agriculture challenges in the future.
 2013 - Official launch of the International Year of Quinoa (IYQ-2013), intended to increase awareness, understanding and knowledge about quinoa and its importance on food security.
2013 - 3rd International Conference on Neglected and Underutilized Species, Accra, Ghana - to ensure that research on neglected and underutilized species (NUS) is demand-oriented and that results are better shared and applied, researchers, extension agents, the private sector and farmers must engage in more collaboration - in sub-Saharan Africa.

See also
 Food security
 Heirloom plant
 List of useful plants
 Slow Food
 Subsistence farming
Food biodiversity

References

External links

 Crops for the Future
 NUS Database Asia
 NewCROP the New Crop Resource Online Program
 NUS Community - Bioversity International
 CGIAR Research Program on Roots, Tubers and Bananas

Agriculture
Economic development
Crops